The Sousa Formation is a Berriasian-Hauterivian geologic formation in Paraíba, Brazil. Fossil sauropod tracks have been reported from the formation.

Ichnofossils 
Among others, these ichnofossils have been reported from the formation:
 Carnosauria indet.
 Coelurosauria indet.
 Moraesichnium barbarenae
 Sousaichnium pricei
 Staurichnium diogenis

See also 
 List of dinosaur-bearing rock formations
 List of stratigraphic units with sauropodomorph tracks
 Sauropod tracks

References

Bibliography

Further reading 
 New dinosaur tracksites from the Sousa Lower Cretaceous basin (Paraíba, Brasil)
 ANP - Brazil Round 9 - Rio do Peixe Basin

Geologic formations of Brazil
Cretaceous Brazil
Berriasian Stage
Hauterivian Stage
Siltstone formations
Sandstone formations
Alluvial deposits
Lacustrine deposits
Ichnofossiliferous formations
Fossiliferous stratigraphic units of South America
Paleontology in Brazil
Formations